Hoseynabad-e Do (also Romanized as Ḩoseynābād-e Do; also known as Hosein Abad, Ḩoseynābād, and Husainābād) is a village in Saadatabad Rural District, Pariz District, Sirjan County, Kerman Province, Iran. At the 2006 census, its population was 206, in 48 families.

References 

Populated places in Sirjan County